Julius Hoste may refer to:

 Julius Hoste Sr. (1848-1933), Belgian writer and founder of Het Laatste Nieuws
 Julius Hoste Jr. (1884-1954), Belgian liberal politician